The Cvrcka is a river which flows through Bosnia, the largest left bank tributary of the river Vrbanja. 

It rises on the northern slopes of Čemernica, on the same drainage divide as the Jakotina, another tributary of the same river, and the streams that flow into the Ugar. It is formed by two rivers: Međurača (source at about 1,200 m) and Vukača (source at about 1,150 m). Its estuary is between Večići and Vrbanjci (310 m above sea level).

See also 
 Kotor Varoš

References 

Rivers of Bosnia and Herzegovina